During the 1978–79 English football season, Arsenal F.C. competed in the Football League First Division.

Squad

Results

First Division

Football League Cup

FA Cup

Arsenal entered the FA Cup in the third round proper, in which they were drawn to face Sheffield Wednesday.

UEFA Cup

Top scorers

First Division
  Frank Stapleton 17
  Liam Brady 13
  Alan Sunderland 9

References

External links
 Arsenal 1978–79 on statto.com

Arsenal
Arsenal F.C. seasons